Darwin Kastle Mess (born 26 July 1971), more commonly known as simply Darwin Kastle, is a champion Magic: The Gathering player from the United States of America, and was a member of the inaugural class elected to the Magic: The Gathering Pro Tour Hall of Fame in 2005. Kastle also ranks 12th on the all time Pro Tour earnings list. Kastle's likeness is depicted on the card Avalanche Riders, which he also designed after winning the second Magic Invitational.

Darwin Kastle is also a game designer and the Creative Director for White Wizard Games. Their deckbuilding game Star Realms has won numerous awards, including the 2015 SXSW Tabletop Game of the Year Award, four Golden Geek Awards for Best 2-Player Game, Best Card Game, Best Indie Game and Best Handheld Game, two Dice Tower Awards for Best Two-Player Game and Best Small Publisher, and Best Card Game: Fan Favorite at Origins 2015. He has designed Star Realms, Hero Realms, The Battle for Hill 218, The Battle for Sector 219, and Space Station Assault. He has also worked on Epic Card Game, the VS Trading Card game, Battleground Fantasy Warfare, EpicTCG, and Ascension: Chronicle of the Godslayer.

Top 8 appearances

Other accomplishments
 2005 Hall of Fame inductee
 Last player to have played all Pro Tours after 48 appearances from 1996 PT New York to 2004 PT Kobe

References

External links
 White Wizard Games website
 Star Realms website
 Epic Card Game website
 Hero Realms website

Living people
American Magic: The Gathering players
1971 births
People from Middlesex County, Connecticut
People from Framingham, Massachusetts